Qalandar Bakhsh Jurat (born Yahya Khan), was an Indian poet of the Lucknow school. He was born 1748 in Delhi but spent his childhood in Faizabad and later migrated to Lucknow. He was the disciple of Mirza Jafar Ali Hasrat and a close friend of Insha Allah Khan 'Insha'. He is known for depicting romantic encounters with the beloved in lurid details. Jurat lost his eye sight in the prime of youth. He was fond of Poetry since his childhood. He was expert in Music and Astrology.

He was not a highly educated person but he was sharp-witted and imaginative and was a regular at the court of Sulieman Shikoh. He was a fluent writer of ghazals. He died in Lucknow in 1809. A collection of his ghazals – Kuliyaat e Jurat, was last published in 1968 by Majlis Taraqii e Adab, Lahore.

A sher from his ghazal:

اب گزارا نہیں اس شوخ کے در پر اپنا

جس کے گھر کو یہ سمجھتے تھے کہ ہے گھر اپنا

Books Published After His Death:

Muntakhab Deewan-e-Jurat - Gudasta-e-Musarrat in 1868: 
 Publisher: Matba Nizami, Kanpur

Kulyat-e-Jurat Volume 001 in 1968: 
 Editor: Dr. Iqtida Hassan 
 Publisher: Majlis-e-Taraqqi-e-Adab, Lahore

Kulyate-e-Jurat in 1971: 
 Editor: Noorul Hassan Naqvi
 Publisher: Matba Muslim University Aligarh

Intikhab Kalam-e-Jura'at in 1980: 
 Editor: M. Habeeb Khan
 Publisher: Jamal Printing Press, Delhi

Poetry Collection: 
Jurat's 78 Ghazals and 122 Shers are available on Rekhta.org

Ghazal Sung by Artist: 
His Ghazal "Aye dil hum hove paband e gham e yar ke tu" was sung by Ustad Amanat Ali Khan

References

Urdu-language poets from India
Muslim poets
18th-century Indian Muslims
Indian male poets
1748 births
1810 deaths
18th-century Indian poets
Poets from Delhi
18th-century male writers